Jharauli Khurd  is a village located in Shahabad Markanda town of Kurukshetra district in Haryana state of India. It is about 4 km aside   from Grand Trunk Road.The village is  surrounded by Babain Tehsil towards East, Ambala Tehsil towards North, Thanesar Tehsil towards South, Kurukshetra Tehsil towards South. According to Census 2011, its  population is 1301 out of which 515 are schedules castes population.
 Total families are 241 in numbers, only two of them are Muslim families. While the area of village is 345 hectares, there is one primary school (Geeta Vidya Mandir Jhrouli Khurd est.1998), one middle school  (GMS Jharauli Khurd est. 1956)  and one veterinary  dispensary  in the village. The Literacy rate is 75.31 % which is slightly lower than that of Haryana. The village is administrated by an elected Sarpanch.
 Mr. Hartinder Pal Singh  is the present Sarpanch of the village. Wheat, paddy and sugar cane are main yields of the village. The village code of Jharauli Khurd is 58347.

History 
According to Punjab Chiefs, Sardar Chuhar Singh    from village Chung in Patti Tehsil, Amritsar, Punjab, India  received Jharauli Ilaqa as his share after winning  the  battle of Sirhind in 1764. Under the British protection in 1809,  Jharauli was one of ten villages collectively given the status of Jagir under Chuhar Singh's descendants. Although, the village is now dominated by Sikhs, there were less than ten Sikh  families during  1890s.  Jharauli, Rania and Khari states were center of  Shaheedi Misl in Sikh period.  The Muslim population of the village  migrated to Pakistan in 1947. The village was electrified in 1961.

References

Villages in Kurukshetra district